Scientific experiments often consist of comparing two or more sets of data. 
This data is described as unpaired or independent when the sets of data arise from separate individuals or paired when it arises from the same individual at different points in time. For example one clinical trial might involve measuring the blood pressure from one group of patients who were given a medicine and the blood pressure from another group not given it. This would be unpaired data. Another clinical trial might record the blood pressure in the same group of patients before and after giving the medicine. In this case the data is "paired" as it is likely the blood pressure after giving the medicine will be related to the blood pressure of that patient before the medicine was given.

The statistical tests used to compare sets of data have been designed for data that is either paired or unpaired and it is important to use the correct test to prevent erroneous results.

Examples of tests for unpaired data:
 Pearson's Chi-squared test
 Fisher's Exact Test

Examples of tests suitable for paired data:
 McNemar's Test
 paired permutation test

See also

Paired difference test

Notes

Statistical tests